During the 1992–93 English football season, Norwich City F.C. competed in the inaugural season of the Premier League. Norwich City led the league for much of the season, having been among the pre-season favourites for relegation, and were eight points clear of the field shortly before Christmas, before faltering in the final weeks to finish third behind the champions, Manchester United, and Aston Villa.

On the first day of the Premier League season, achieving an impressive 4–2 away win over an Arsenal side who were among the pre-season title favourites in a race finally won by Manchester United. This was a big surprise not least to the media and pundits who had tipped Norwich for a season of struggle.

Build up to the season

Transfers In
 Mark Robins - Manchester United, 1992, £800,000
 Gary Megson - Manchester City, 1992, Free Transfer
 Efan Ekoku - Bournemouth, 26 March, £500,000

Transfers Out
 Robert Fleck - Chelsea, 1992, £2,100,000

Season summary

August

Norwich had finished 18th the previous season and sold star striker Robert Fleck to Chelsea for a club record fee. This lead many pundits and experts to tip the Canaries to struggle in the new Premier League. In the opening weekend of the season Norwich City faced Arsenal at Highbury. Norwich did little to dispel these early predictions, finding themselves 2–0 behind at half time courtesy of goals from Steve Bould and Kevin Campbell. However the introduction of Mark Robins as a substitute was to set the tone for the rest of season. He quickly reduced the arrears with a diving header from a David Phillips free kick. Phillips, himself draw Norwich level after David Seaman misjudged a straightforward right wing cross. Ruel Fox then gave Norwich the lead from a tight angle before Robins sealed the comeback, pouncing on a mistake by Tony Adams to loft the ball over Seaman into the net.

Gaining points from losing positions was a key feature of Norwich's early season form. Another deft chip from Robins secured victory over Chelsea after falling behind to an early strike from Graham Stuart, while a Ruel Fox header salvaged a point against Everton. Norwich's first defeat of the season inevitably came at Manchester City, a ground they had not won at since 1964. However Norwich quickly bounced back to record a fine victory at Crystal Palace courtesy of a stunning scissor kick from David Phillips. At the end of the month Norwich played host to Nottingham Forest knowing that a win would put them top of the Premier League. In front of the Sky cameras, Ian Crook gave the Canaries the lead with a stunning free kick which was promptly cancelled out by an acute yet precise finish from Nigel Clough (both goals appearing at #11 and #12 on the 'Goals Goals Goals: 101 of the Very Best 1992/93 Premier League Goals' VHS). However Norwich were not to be denied and a defensive mix up allowed Lee Power to restore Norwich's lead. David Phillips sealed victory following a clever layback from Rob Newman.

September

Norwich continued to defy expectations in September. Mark Robins bundled home late on against Southampton to hand Norwich the points despite a fine display from Tim Flowers in the Saints goal. The Canaries then travelled to Stamford Bridge, quickly finding themselves 2 goals behind from strikes by Mick Harford and Andy Townsend. However Norwich worked their way back into the contest thanks to some calamitous goalkeeping from Dave Beasant who allowed Mark Robins' tame effort to creep past him. Beasant was again caught out of position as Robins sidefooted Norwich's equalizer. However things went from bad to worse for Beasant who then allowed David Phillips scuffed shot to somehow squirm through his hands, gifting Norwich the points. Their position at the top of table was further entrenched with victory over Sheffield Wednesday at Carrow Road and a draw against Coventry City at Highfield Road. The Sky Blues were also upsetting the bookies with a fine start to the season of their own.  Ian Crook's scything shot was cancelled out by a superb individual effort from Peter Ndlovu (both goals appearing at #22 and #23 on the 'Goals Goals Goals' VHS).

October

The start of the month saw Norwich surrender their lead at the top of the Premiership in spectacular style with a 7–1 thrashing by newly promoted Blackburn Rovers at Ewood Park. Alan Shearer underlined his status as the most promising young striker in the country with an outstanding display. This result helped to ensure that despite an eventual third-place finish, Norwich had the dubious distinction of finishing the season with a negative goal difference (-4).

Norwich bounced back from their Blackburn disaster by progressing to next of league cup with comfortable home win against Carlisle United. Chris Sutton scoring two identical headers from two identical Ian Culverhouse crosses. However, football was soon to pale into total insignificance as personal tragedy befell Norwich keeper Bryan Gunn. His daughter Francesca losing her brave battle against leukemia. Gunn remarkably played just days later in a 2–1 home success against QPR. Mark Bowen gave Norwich the lead before Chris Sutton powered home a second. Bradley Allen pounced on a poor backpass to set up a tense finish. However, Norwich and most significantly Gunn were not to be denied.

Norwich arrived on Merseyside in confident mood to take on Liverpool. It was a year when the Reds would fall way below their usual high standards. Norwich opened the scoring through Ian Butterworth, but Liverpool struck back to lead 2–1. The game then turned when Mark Bowen blazed widely over from the spot. Liverpool running out comfortable 4–1 winners. Further disappointment was to follow against struggling Middlesbrough. It took a late Daryl Sutch strike to keep Norwich in touch at the top.

November

The start of the month saw Norwich travel to Boundary Park in front of the sky cameras. In a pulsating game, a Mark Robins hat trick put Norwich City back on top of the Premier League after twice being pegged back by Oldham, with Oldham's second equalizer coming from a wonderful chip from outside the box by Ian Marshall. Norwich further stretched their advantage with a home win against Sheffield United. This was trumped by an outstanding 3–2 success at Villa Park. Norwich opened the scoring through David Phillips with Darren Beckford doubling the lead after a mistake from Nigel Spink. Villa leveled the game at 2–2 before Daryl Sutch scored the winner with a fierce drive.

December

David Phillips winner was enough to sink Wimbledon at Carrow Road. This meant that Norwich had now extended their lead at the top of the Premiership to 8 points. Norwich travelled to Old Trafford in confident mood ahead of the game against Manchester United. The game was settled by a goal from Mark Hughes who capitalized on a mistake by Daryl Sutch to fire past Bryan Gunn. It was a watershed moment for the Canaries who were about to embark on a 6 match winless run which would ultimately go a long way towards costing them the title.

Local rivals Ipswich chalked up an emphatic victory at Carrow Road with goals from Steve Thompson and Chris Kywomia. The year ended with disappointing goalless draws against Spurs and Leeds.

January

The new year failed to bring a change of fortune as Nigel Worthington's goal was enough for Sheffield Wednesday to secure all 3 points at Hillsborough (he would be manager of the Canaries seven years later). Norwich netted their first goal in almost 8 hours of football against Coventry but were eventually pegged back by a strike from Mick Quinn. Norwich regarded their first win since the start of December with a fine 4–2 success against Crystal Palace. Lee Power capping a fine individual performance with 2 goals. Norwich were further buoyed by a 1–0 success at Goodison Park through Chris Sutton.

February

A heavy 3–0 defeat at Southampton was to follow before the Canaries chalked up their first win over Man City in nearly 30 years. This came courtesy of 2 goals in as many minutes. Norwich went some way to wiping away the memories of their disaster at Ewood Park with 0–0 draw at Carrow Road based on a strong defensive performance.

March

April

May

FA Cup
1992–93 FA Cup

League Cup
1992–93 Football League Cup

Final league table

Players

First-team squad
Squad at end of season

Notes

References

Norwich City F.C. seasons
Norwich City